George Miller (19 August 1929 – 19 August 2016) was a Scottish cricketer. He played one first-class match for Scotland in 1955. He was also the secretary for the Scottish Cricket Union between 1966 and 1976.

References

External links
 

1929 births
2016 deaths
Scottish cricketers
Cricketers from Edinburgh